William Fitch was an American Negro league pitcher in the 1920s.

Fitch played for the Lincoln Giants in 1926. In four recorded appearances on the mound, he posted an 8.10 ERA over 13.1 innings.

References

External links
 and Seamheads

Year of birth missing
Year of death missing
Place of birth missing
Place of death missing
Lincoln Giants players